St. John's Chapel may refer to:

in England
 St John's Chapel, London
 St John's Chapel, Bedford Row - another London church
 St John's Chapel, County Durham - a village in County Durham
 St John's College Chapel, Cambridge

in Singapore
St. John's Chapel, Singapore - a church located within St. Margaret's Secondary School in Farrer Road

in the United States
St. John's Chapel (New York City), a demolished nineteenth-century Episcopal church
St. John Chapel (Columbus, Georgia), listed on the National Register of Historic Places in Georgia
St. John's Chapel of St. Michael's Parish, listed on the National Register of Historic Places in Maryland
Episcopal Church of the Advent / St. John's Chapel, an Episcopal church in Cape May, New Jersey

See also
St. John the Baptist Church (disambiguation)
St. John's Cathedral (disambiguation)
St. John's Church (disambiguation)
St. John's Episcopal Church (disambiguation)
St. John the Evangelist Church (disambiguation)